Mrs Loud is the debut album by Lorraine Crosby, released under her stage name Mrs Loud in 2008. The album is available for digital download via iTunes or from Lorraine's website.

The album was first self-released by Crosby in 2007 before a signing with Rant n Rave Records in 2008.

Track listing

Personnel
Lorraine Crosby - lead and backing vocals
The Caffrey Brothers - Backing vocals
Stuart Emerson - Guitar, bass guitar, keyboards, piano, drum programming, backing vocals
Paul Smith - Drums
Lee Harvey - Drums

References

External links
 Lorraine Crosby's official website

2008 debut albums
Rock albums by English artists